The Fresh Film Fest International Film Festival or Fresh Film Fest is an international student film festival held annually in August in Karlovy Vary, Czech Republic, first held in 2004.

History

The Fresh Film Fest is a successor of the CILECT festival that took place in Karlovy Vary during the 1980s, initially as an independent festival and subsequently as part of the Karlovy Vary International Film Festival (KVIFF). Over the years the CILECT festival was attended by filmmakers including Jan Svěrák and Emir Kusturica.

Fresh Film Festival was founded in 2004 by three students from the Film and TV School of The Academy of Performing Arts in Prague (FAMU), as a competitive showcase of student films in the Czech Republic. The organizing team, consisting mostly of students from FAMU, presents public screenings of over 250 mainly student films each year, from various countries and genres.

Format

Fresh Film Fest is the largest international student film competition in the so-called Visegrad region (Czech Republic, Slovakia, Hungary, Poland). It is held over five days at the end of August and beginning of September, during which time around 300 works of student cinematography from around the world are shown across six cinema halls, as well as feature-length film screenings and music concerts. The festival screens an array of Central and Eastern European student films focused on the Visegrad Group countries. This section has been broadened to present work from across the whole Eastern European region. The festival also maintains contact with high-profile film schools including the Gerasimov Institute of Cinematography in Moscow, La Fémis in Paris, FAMU in Prague, the National Film and Television School in England, and Columbia University in New York, as well as showing student films from areas less well-known for film, such as Ecuador, Hong Kong, and Cuba. Fresh Film Fest usually opens its call for entries at the beginning of January and ends on April 30.

Each year since 2006, the festival has honoured one figure in international film by screening a retrospective program of all their films. One of those honoured in this way was Corneliu Porumboiu, a participant in the first Fresh Film Fest competition and winner of the Camera d'Or (Golden Camera) at the Cannes Film Festival.

The festival is accompanied by a program of other activities and events, including professional workshops and seminars, school presentations and evening parties. The festivals juries are made up of film industry figures who award prizes for the best work.

Fresh Film Fest is a partner event of the KVIFF, with overlapping organizing teams, and originates from the expansion of its Student Films section. As a result, Fresh Film Fest can take advantage of many facilities used during KVIFF, including a 1000-capacity cinema hall, and five other cinemas, as well as the festival club scene and several lounge rooms.

Staff 

The members of the juries are mostly younger film-makers. The members of the pre-selection committees are program directors of various international film festivals such as Anifest, Prague's Febiofest, or the program managers of KVIFF and the Institute of Documentary Film.

The festival organisers have received awards for the festival itself, including two FAMU awards. The director of the second Fresh Film Fest trailer, Jakub Kohák, was awarded third prize for Best Trailer at the Czech advertising awards, "Louskáček". The second Fresh Film Fest visual concept created by art director Adéla Svobodová was awarded at the International Biennale of Graphic Design in Brno. The third Fresh Film Fest visual concept, created by the same author along with graphic designer Pauline Kerleroux, was awarded an Ogilvy CID Prize for Best Corporate Design in 2006, chosen by a jury of Czech graphics professionals and critics.

Festival Winners

2007 

Official Selection - Competition
Best Film Award 
Oliwia Tonteri for the film Lilli, Finland, 2007, 26 min, documentary

Official Selection Théâtre Optique
Théâtre Optique Award 
Tibor Banoczki for the film Milk Teeth, U. K., 2007, 11 min, animation

The Central and Eastern European Films Competition
Magnesia Award for the Best film of the CEE Region 
Paul Manolescu for the film Casa de piatra / I Now Pronounce You, Romania, 2006, 7 min, fiction

Special Jury Prize Official Selection - Competition 
Daniela Rusnoková for the film O Soni a jej rodine / Soňa and her Family, Slovakia, 2006, 37 min, documentary

Special Jury Prize Théâtre Optique 
Zdeněk Durdil for the film Radio Kebrle, Czech Republic, 2006, 16 min, animation

Audience Award
Yasmine Novak for the film Zohar, Israel, 2007, 30 min, fiction

References

External links 
 
Festival site on myspace
Fresh Film Fest on Britfilms
CILECT
Student films on Karlovy Vary International Film Festival
Fresh Film Fest on MediaDesk website

Film festivals in Karlovy Vary
Student film festivals
Recurring events established in 2004
2004 establishments in the Czech Republic
Summer events in the Czech Republic